Kršič is a small settlement above Godič in the Municipality of Kamnik in the Upper Carniola region of Slovenia.

References

External links

Kršič on Geopedia

Populated places in the Municipality of Kamnik